Stan Constant Brenders (May 31, 1904, Brussels - June 1, 1969, Brussels) was a Belgian jazz pianist and bandleader, who founded the first jazz radio orchestra in Belgium and recorded with Django Reinhardt.

References

Belgian jazz bandleaders
Belgian jazz pianists
1904 births
1969 deaths
20th-century Belgian pianists